The I Southern Cross Games (Spanish: Juegos Cruz del Sur) were a multi-sport event held from November 3 to November 12, 1978, in La Paz, Bolivia, with some events in Cochabamba  and Santa Cruz de la Sierra.

La Paz already organized last year's Bolivarian Games and,  
with the necessary infrastructure already being present, hosted the majority of the events. Cochabamba hosted men's basketball, judo, tennis, and men's volleyball, and Santa Cruz de la Sierra, hosted equestrian, fencing, women's volleyball, and weightlifting.

This was the first edition of what would later be the South American Games, organized by the South American Sports Organization (ODESUR).
An appraisal of the games and detailed medal lists were published elsewhere,  emphasizing the results of the Argentinian teams.  There is a further publication emphasizing on the Bolivian athletes.

The South American Torch was lit by Bolivian athletes Roberto Prado in La Paz, Isabel Alemán in Cochabamba, and José Ernesto Roca in Santa Cruz de la Sierra.  The Athlete's Oath was sworn by cyclist Edgar Cueto in La Paz, by judoka Ladislao Moravek in Cochabamba, and by fencer Luís Darío Vásquez in Santa Cruz de la Sierra.

Medal count

The medal count for these Games is tabulated below. This table is sorted by the number of gold medals earned by each country.  The number of silver medals is taken into consideration next, and then the number of bronze medals.

Sports

A total number of 480 athletes competed for medals in sixteen sports:

Aquatics
 Swimming
 Athletics
 Baseball†
 Basketball
 Boxing
Cycling
 Road Cycling
 Track Cycling
 Equestrian
 Fencing
 Football
Gymnastics
 Artistic gymnastics
 Judo
 Shooting
 Tennis
 Volleyball
 Weightlifting
 Wrestling

Note:†  One source only references 15 events with no indication for baseball in the medal lists.

References

External links
La Paz 78 ODESUR page

 
South American Games
South American Games
S
Southern
Southern
Multi-sport events in Bolivia
Sports competitions in La Paz
November 1978 sports events in South America
20th century in La Paz
Sport in Cochabamba
Sports competitions in Santa Cruz de la Sierra
History of Santa Cruz de la Sierra